Strawberry Fields  may refer to:

Places
 Strawberry Field, an orphanage in Liverpool dating back to 1870
 Strawberry Field (airport), a private airport in Atlantic County, New Jersey, United States
 Strawberry Fields (memorial), a memorial to John Lennon in Central Park, New York, dedicated in 1985
 Strawberry Fields (Guantanamo), a secret CIA compound built in 2003 at Guantanamo Bay

Art, entertainment, and media

Music
 "Strawberry Fields Forever" (1967), a  song by the Beatles, inspired by an orphanage (see above)
 Strawberry Fields (Canadian festival), a Woodstock-esque rock festival held in Mosport, Canada, August 6–9, 1970
 Strawberry Fields (English festival), a music festival held annually since 2010 in Leicestershire
 Strawberry Fields (Indian festival), an annual rock festival hosted in Bangalore by the National Law School of India University
 Strawberry Fields (New Zealand festival), a former annual music festival in New Zealand

Theatre
 Strawberry Fields (play), a 1977 theatre play by Stephen Poliakoff

Cinema
 Strawberry Fields (1997 film), a film by Rea Tajiri
 Strawberry Fields (2006 film), a documentary on Palestinian strawberry growers in Gaza
 Strawberry Fields (2011 film), a psycho-drama film by Frances Lea and Judith Johnson
 Strawberry Fields (character), a fictional agent in the 2008 James Bond film Quantum of Solace

Literature
 Strawberry Fields (2007), the name for the US edition of Marina Lewycka's  novel Two Caravans

Other
 Strawberry Fields globe amaranth, a garden flower